Loch Leven is a hamlet in Saskatchewan.

The hamlet shares its name with a lake located in Cypress Hills Interprovincial Park.

Unincorporated communities in Saskatchewan